The Consensus 1991 College Basketball All-American team, as determined by aggregating the results of four major All-American teams.  To earn "consensus" status, a player must win honors from a majority of the following teams: the Associated Press, the USBWA, The United Press International and the National Association of Basketball Coaches.

1991 Consensus All-America team

Individual All-America teams

AP Honorable Mention:

George Ackles, UNLV
Greg Anthony, UNLV
Anthony Avent, Seton Hall
Damon Bailey, Indiana
Shawn Bradley, Brigham Young
Kevin Bradshaw, U. S. International
Terrell Brandon, Oregon
Kevin Brooks, Southwestern Louisiana
Marc Brown, Siena
Greg Carter, Mississippi State
Chris Corchiani, North Carolina State
Dale Davis, Clemson
Rick Fox, North Carolina
Chris Gatling, Old Dominion
Josh Grant, Utah
Litterial Green, Georgia
Allan Houston, Tennessee
Byron Houston, Oklahoma State
Anderson Hunt, UNLV
Bobby Hurley, Duke
Popeye Jones, Murray State
Adam Keefe, Stanford
Treg Lee, Ohio State
Luc Longley, New Mexico
Kevin Lynch, Minnesota
Don MacLean, UCLA
Mark Macon, Temple
Jamal Mashburn, Kentucky
Lee Mayberry, Arkansas
Oliver Miller, Arkansas
Chris Mills, Arizona
Harold Miner, Southern California
Alonzo Mourning, Georgetown
Matt Muehlebach, Arizona
Tracy Murray, UCLA
Doug Overton, La Salle
John Pelphrey, Kentucky
Mark Randall, Kansas
James Robinson, Alabama
Malik Sealy, St. John's
Chris Smith, Connecticut
Bryant Stith, Virginia
Clarence Weatherspoon, Southern Miss
Brian Williams, Arizona
Joey Wright, Texas

References

NCAA Men's Basketball All-Americans
All-Americans